Schumacher or Schuhmacher is an occupational surname (German, "shoemaker", pronounced , both variants can be used as surnames, with Schumacher being the more popular one, however, only the variant with three "h"s can also be used as a job description in modern German spelling). The variant Schumaker is also commonly seen in the USA. Still another variant is Shumacher.

Notable people with the surname include:

Science
 Benjamin Schumacher, American theoretical physicist, married to Carol
 Carol Schumacher, Bolivian-American mathematician, married to Benjamin
 E. F. Schumacher (1911–1977), British economist
 Eugen Schuhmacher (1906–1973), German zoologist and pioneer of animal documentaries
 Heinrich Christian Schumacher (1780–1850), German astronomer
 Heinrich Christian Friedrich Schumacher, (1757–1830), German-Danish surgeon, botanist, malacologist and anatomist
 William S. Massey (1920–2017), American mathematician

Sports
 Anton Schumacher (born 1938), German football goalkeeper
 Cori Schumacher (born 1977), American international surfer, politician and three times WSL Women’s World Longboard Champion
 David Schumacher (wrestler), (born 1931), Australian wrestler
 David Schumacher (racing driver), (born 2001) German racing driver, son of Ralf Schumacher
 Flávio Sérgio Viana (born 1975), Brazilian futsal defender known as Schumacher
 Günther Schumacher (born 1949), German track and road cyclist and two times Olympics Men's Team Pursuit winner
 Harald Schumacher (born 1954), German football goalkeeper, West Germany team captain and one time UEFA Euro champion
 Irma Heijting-Schuhmacher (1925–2014), Dutch freestyle swimmer
 John Schuhmacher (born 1955), American football player
 Katie Schumacher-Cawley (born 1980), American volleyball/basketball player and coach
 Kelly Schumacher (born 1977), Canadian WNBA basketball player and two times WNBA champion
 Kurt Schumacher (American football) (born 1952), NFL player
 Michael Schumacher (born 1969), German Formula One driver and seven times Formula One World Champion
 Schumacher (film) documentary from 2021 about the above
 Mick Schumacher (born 1999), German Formula One driver, son of seven times World Champion Michael Schumacher
 Ralf Schumacher (born 1975), German DTM driver, former Formula One driver, younger brother of Michael Schumacher
 Raymond R. Schumacher (1924–1973), American football player
 Sandra Schumacher (born 1966), German track and road cyclist
 Stefan Schumacher (born 1981), German road racing cyclist
 Steven Schumacher (born 1984), English football midfielder and manager
 Tony Schumacher (drag racer) (born 1969), American dragster racer and eight times NHRA Top Fuel champion
Don Schumacher (born 1944), American dragster racer, NHRA team owner who led the team to win eighteen NHRA championships in three different NHRA categories, and father of Tony Schumacher

Other
 Albert Schumacher (1802–1871), German/American businessman in Baltimore, official Consul General of Bremen and Hamburg in Baltimore, honorary citizen of Bremen 
 Cora Schumacher (born 1976), German actress, model, racing driver and presenter
 David Schumacher (producer), (born 1969), American film and television producer/presenter.
 Elisabeth Schumacher (1904–1942), artist and German executed Resistance fighter
 Emil Schumacher (1912–1999), German artist, co-founder of abstract art movement in Germany and representative of the "Informel" movement
 Ferdinand Schumacher (1822–1908), American entrepreneur known as "the Oatmeal King"
 Fritz Schumacher (architect), (1869–1947), German architect and urban designer
 Gottlieb Schumacher (1857–1925), American civil engineer, architect and archaeologist 
 Ida Schumacher (1894–1956), Bavarian theatre actress and comedian
 Jean-Pierre Schumacher (1924–2021), French Trappist monk
 Joel Schumacher (1939–2020), American film director, writer and producer
 John Schumacher (Los Angeles pioneer) (about 1816–1885)
 John J. Schumacher, founded Southwestern University School of Law
 Kurt Schumacher (1895–1952), German social-democratic political leader
 Kurt Schumacher (sculptor) (1905–1942), German sculptor and executed Resistance fighter
 Martina Schumacher (born 1972), German painter and conceptual artist
 Peder Griffenfeld (born Schumacher, 1635–1699), Danish statesman
 Thomas Schumacher, American theatrical producer
 Troy Schumacher, New York City ballet dancer 
 Wim Schumacher (1894–1986), Dutch painter and designer

See also 

 David Schumacher (disambiguation)
 John Schumacher (disambiguation)
 Kurt Schumacher (disambiguation)
 Tony Schumacher (disambiguation)

 Shoemaker (surname)
 Schumaker (surname)

Occupational surnames
German-language surnames
Jewish surnames